Northwest High School is a public high school located in Colerain Township, Hamilton County, Ohio, United States, near Cincinnati.  It is part of the Northwest Local School District.

The school colors are blue and gold. The motto is "Educating Leaders for Tomorrow". The mascot is the knight, and the sports teams are known as "The Knights."

Athletics
Northwest offers several sports, including baseball, volleyball, softball, basketball, track and field, cross country, cheerleading, soccer, football, swimming, golf, bowling, tennis, and wrestling.

Northwest competes in the Southwest Ohio Conference.
All competitive sports teams from the school are Division I, except the football team, which is Division II. Their cross country team has improved in the last three years. The Lady Knights' cross country team was crowned League Champions two years in a row. The men's team is also highly competitive, as they have finished second in Leagues two years in a row.

Clubs and organizations
Northwest High School offers a variety of clubs, including Green Club, Latin Club, Student Senate, Key Club, Cabin Time (Christian Organization), O.A.B., and United Knights.

School music programs include String Orchestra and Band (including Jazz Band, Symphonic Band, and Concert Band). A marching band performs at all home and some away football games. During the winter season, a band plays at home basketball games. A choir branches off into a Women's Ensemble,  which performs in the community along with a competitive show choir known as "Knight Lights" that has performed in competitions in Ohio and Indiana. For the last two years, the Women's Ensemble has been on the Star64 Holiday Carols program, which  showcases the area's best choirs.

The school's Latin Club functions as a local chapter of both the Ohio Junior Classical League and National Junior Classical League.

Alumni
 Preston Brown - linebacker with the Cincinnati Bengals 
 Jeremy Chappell - professional basketball player 
 Mark Clouse - CEO of Campbell Soup Company
 Lewis Johnson - ESPN commentator 
 Jaycie Phelps - Olympic gymnast and member of the 1996 Olympic gold medal U.S. women's gymnastics team
 Scott Sauerbeck - former Major League Baseball player
 Quentin Sims - NFL and Arena Football League player

External links
Northwest's official website

References

High schools in Hamilton County, Ohio
Public high schools in Ohio